This is a list of significant or recurring characters in the Ultima series of computer games, indicating the games in which they appeared.

The Avatar and Companions

 Yes : The companion is in that game.
 No : The companion is not in that game.
 Join : The companion may join the Avatar's party, or has joined already.
 AE : An alter-ego of the companion is in that game.
 AEJ : An alter-ego of the companion is in that game, and may join the Avatar's party.
 M/R : The companion is only mentioned or referenced in that game.

The Avatar

The Avatar is the main character in the series. The Avatar is first known as the Stranger from another world, who defeats Mondain, Minax, and their spawn, Exodus. The Stranger becomes the Avatar once his goal changes to following the path of the Virtues, and retrieving the Codex of Ultimate Wisdom from the Great Stygian Abyss. This is noted as one of the first uses of "Avatar" in the virtual context. In the fifth episode, the Avatar defeats a repressive regime over Britannia, and in the sixth he brings peace between men and gargoyles. In the first part of the seventh episode, the Avatar infiltrates the Fellowship in order to stop the Guardian from entering Britannia; in the second part, the Avatar prevents imbalance from destroying the universe and receives the title of the Hierophant of Balance. In the eighth episode, the Avatar escapes the world of Pagan by defeating the four Titans, becoming the Titan of Ether. In the ninth and final episode, the Avatar defeats the Guardian by destroying both himself and the Guardian with the Armageddon spell. The Avatar is also the main character in both Ultima Underworld games.

The Avatar can be customized as a male or female in many of the games. Later games allow the customization of skin and hair color as well. The default Avatar is depicted as a blond-haired, blue-eyed male. The character is noted as the first to have a selection between genders and races, and the female version is noted to be "feminine, but not hypersexual." The Avatar's trademark clothing often includes a suit of chain mail, with a white, red or orange tunic over it, and a red cape. An ankh is usually part of the Avatar's clothing. Typically, the character is also shown wielding a sword. In Ultima VIII, the Avatar's face is obscured by a large helmet. The Avatar is voiced by J.C. Shakespeare in Ultima IX.

The Avatar was initially designed to be a blank slate through which players could reflect their own personality Ultima was one of the first computer games to allow players to choose their gender and race. However, the Avatar eventually evolved to take on a more specific appearance and character.

The Eight Companions 
The Eight Companions are the ones who join the Stranger in his quest to attain the Avatarhood in Ultima IV (in fact, only seven of them join the Stranger in the game; the one who has the same profession as the Stranger will not join the party, as that profession's role is fulfilled by the Stranger). They are special in the way that each of them originally practices a particular profession which connects with one of the eight virtues and the town of that virtue. They are the Avatar's first ever followers, and many of them join the Avatar again in subsequent adventures. Starting from Ultima IV, the Eight Companions appear in all the primary games of the series that are set in Britannia, i.e., Ultima IV, V, VI, VII (Part I) and IX, and many of them can be asked to join the Avatar's party in these games. Some of them take up other professions in later games.
 Iolo  is one of the most famed bards in Britannia, and a bowyer famous for his crossbows. He lives in Britain in Ultima IV. While he and Gwenno have always been in the game series and seen together since Ultima II, they are finally revealed to be husband and wife in the manual of Ultima V where his full name is revealed to be Iolo FitzOwen. He is the creator of the music for the famous song, "Stones", for which Gwenno wrote the lyrics. He owns the talking horse, Smith, who constantly makes sarcastic comments about the Avatar. By Ultima VII he has owned two bow shops. He is based on the real life bowyer and composer David R. Watson.
 Shamino Sallé Dacil is a ranger living in Skara Brae. Originally, he was a ruler of one of the eight kingdoms of ancient Sosaria. He and the King of the White Dragon shared the rulership of the Lands of Danger and Despair. Some time after meeting the Stranger and assisting him in his quest in Ultima I, he set out to meet his old friend, Lord British. He got trapped in Britannia when Mondain's defeat led to the separation of the four Sosarian continents, leaving his lover, Beatrix, behind. He has become a ranger by Ultima IV. Shamino accompanies the Avatar to the Serpent Isle in Ultima VII Part II, which turns out to be the old Lands of Danger and Despair. Beatrix's ghost appears to him, initially hostile, but eventually forgives him for leaving, and departs to the afterlife after giving him a book of love sonnets. He later is trapped by the Guardian in the void, but is freed by the Avatar at the end. Shamino is based on Richard Garriott, as it is his persona name in the Society for Creative Anachronism. He took the name from his bicycle, a Shimano. A sequence in Ultima VI has a conversation between the NPC Finn who also looks like Garriot that references that both he, Shamino and Lord British are the same person.
 Dupre is a paladin and the mayor of the town of Trinsic. He joins the Stranger on his quest to become the Avatar. He becomes a regular companion for the following games. He is knighted sometime between Ultima VI and Ultima VII. In Ultima V, he is found hiding on the island of Bordermarch. Being quite fond of wine and women, he often stays in taverns while not traveling, and he even does a study for a series of travel guides. In Ultima VII, he runs up a substantial bar tab, and the Avatar has the option of paying it off. He eventually sacrifices himself to save Serpent Isle, and he is later resurrected to help fight the Guardian in Ultima IX. He is based on Richard Garriott's real-life friend Greg Dykes.
 Jaana is a druid and a friend of Lord British. Once Blackthorn takes over, she is declared as an outlaw, and actively works with the resistance against him. She later moves to Cove and becomes the local healer, and later helps fight against the Guardian. Richard Garriott named her after a friend of his from Finland with the same name.
 Julia is a tinker with a Scottish accent first found in Minoc. In Ultima VII, she helps uncover the flaws in Owen's shipbuilding. In Ultima IX, the one game in the Ultima series in which the Avatar cannot be female, she confesses she was in love with him. She is based on someone Garriott once dated.
 Katrina is a shepherd, and the only survivor of the daemon attack that destroyed the island port city of Magincia. She still lives in the ruins of the destroyed city. Later, Magincia is resettled as New Magincia, a simple agricultural community that, unlike its predecessor, embraces the virtue of Humility. Katrina becomes one of its first citizens. She later ends up as the only citizen after it is abandoned, and the Avatar helps restore Humility to the area. She is based on a friend of Richard Garriott's that goes by the nickname Trina.
 Geoffrey is a fighter first met in Jhelom. He becomes captain of the guard, and helps defend against gargoyles. He eventually retires to Lord British's castle. Geoffrey is based on Jeff Hillhouse, Origin's first and last employee.
 Mariah is a mage and a resident of Moonglow. She seeks adventure, and after being attacked by Shadowlords, she hides in Lycaeum and meets the Avatar. In Ultima VI, she can translate the two pieces of the Gargoyles' tablet. After insanity affects many of the mages in the area, she is very depressed, though the Avatar manages to fix the problems. Mariah is based on Richard Garriott's real-life personal assistant, Michelle Caddel.

Other companions
Apart from the Eight Companions, the Avatar may ask other characters to join his party starting from Ultima V. Some of these characters may have been appearing in the game series a number of times already, and some may join the Avatar in multiple games, while others may appear only once in the series. In some cases, minor NPCs join the party only for a very short period of time. Yet some of them may play a major role and be part of the party throughout the entire game.
 Gwenno is an entertainer, scholar and an explorer, who appears frequently with her husband Iolo in the series. She joins the Avatar's party to accompany her husband from time to time. In the Ultima V game manual, she is listed as having written the lyrics to the song "Stones", and her full name is Gwenllian Gwalch'gaeaf. She was based on Kathleen Jones, the real-life wife of David R. Watson (Iolo).
 Sentri is a fighter and occasional companion of the Avatar. He first appears as Sentri the Swashbuckler in the prison in New San Antonio in Ultima II. He later becomes the Baron and keeper of Serpent Hold, essentially the ruler of all the southern islands. In Ultima VII, he lives in Britain and is willing to train the Avatar and other companions for free after joining the party. While Sentri does not appear in Ultima IX, a magical pair of leggings belonging to him can be found in Trinsic.
 Gorn is a prisoner in Lord Blackthorn's castle in Ultima V that joins the party and helps them escape. He is found in Ultima VI in the dungeon under Terfin, at which point he again joins the party. In Ultima VII, he is found worshiping an entity named Brohm behind the Fellowship Meditation Retreat that the Guardian is impersonating, and tells the Avatar to go away. A barbarian with a distinctive accent, he was based on Arnold Schwarzenegger's portrayal of Conan the Barbarian.
 Johne's ship Ararat was swallowed by a great whirlpool and dragged into the Underworld, some time before the beginning of Ultima V. He was driven insane when he discovered the three Shards of the Gem of Immortality, and he killed his three companions. From their blood the three Shadowlords were created. The Avatar finds him stranded in the wreckage. He eagerly asks to join the Avatar's party to avenge his wrongdoing. By Ultima VI, now known as Captain John, he is living in Hythloth, studying the gargoyles and teaching Beh Lem the human language. He sent the silver tablet to Mariah to let the humans understand the gargoyles, but never knew what actually happened to it. Captain John asks the Avatar to help the gargoyles and teaches the hero the Gargish language.
 Maxwell is a low-level fighter in Serpent's Hold in Ultima V.
 Toshi is a low-level bard in Empath Abbey in Ultima V.
 Saduj is a member of Blackthorn's organization "Oppression" in Ultima V. If he is allowed to join, he will betray and attack the Avatar's party whenever combat is engaged.
 Seggallion is a pirate lord who gives the Avatar the spyglass in Ultima V. The Avatar meets him again in Ultima VI. He tells the Avatar that he is a fighter from the realm of Ashtalarea (a world from Knights of Legend). He says that he was fighting an evil minion in his homeworld and their struggle brought him through a moongate to Britannia. There is no way to send him back to Ashtalarea.
 Beh Lem is a young gargoyle who joins the Avatar's party to escort them safely into Vesper and the realm of the gargoyles in Ultima VI.
 Blaine is a wandering gypsy juggler who may join the Avatar's party in Ultima VI.
 Leodon and Leonna are two fair-haired ship captains staying in Buccaneer's Den in Ultima VI. They offer to join the Avatar's party and possess good fighting skills and equipment.
 Sherry is a talking mouse recruited by the Avatar to scout out small places in Ultima VI. She is later seen as a helper in Lord British's Nursery in Ultima VII: The Black Gate, commonly found telling children nursery rhymes. She was based on Sherry Hunter, a former girlfriend of Richard Garriott's who also was the basis for the actress portraying Sherry in a play in Ultima VII that his alter-ego Shamino's dates.
 Spark is a young adolescent in Ultima VII that asks to join the Avatar's party to help bring his father's murderers to justice. He was based on the son of programmer Raymond Benson.
 Tseramed is a ranger in Ultima VII is adept at killing giant bees and using their venom to make sleep-inducing arrows, earning the anger of a couple living within their hive. If he joins the party, he tells of his grudge against Fellowship leaders Elizabeth & Abraham for causing the death of his lover Lady M. by forbidding her to seek help for severe illness based on Fellowship mistrust of healers. He is based on Ken Demarest III, the lead programmer for Ultima VII, who frequently used Tseramed as his online pseudonym.
 Selina is an adept from Moonshade in Ultima VII Part Two: Serpent Isle. She may have her own reason to join the Avatar's party.
 Boydon is a Frankenstein-like being in Ultima VII Part Two who used to be Erstam's assistant but ended up as his experiment subject and was hacked to pieces yet kept still alive. He can join the Avatar after his body is put back together.
 Stefano is a magic thief that helps the Avatar escape the Mountains of Freedom in Ultima VII Part Two.
 Wilfred is a Bear Knight of Monitor in Ultima VII Part Two. He may be asked to join the party later in the game, but may not be what he appears to be.
 Petra is an automaton in Moonshade in Ultima VII Part Two. She helps Rocco run the Blue Boar. She is needed later in the game to help the Avatar with the quest.
 Sethys has been kept alive for centuries in the Temple of Tolerance in Ultima VII Part Two. He helps the Avatar in summoning the shade of the Hierophant of Chaos.
 A regular iron automaton can be animated with the Create Automaton spell and added as a member of the party in Ultima VII Part Two.
 Raven is Samhayne's secret daughter. Initially the Avatar is double-crossed and gets arrested by Blackthorn for a task given by Samhayne. However, Raven and Samhayne choose to support the Avatar afterwards. Raven even lets the Avatar navigate her ship, The Silver Hart, to various places. Later in the game she gets intimate with the Avatar. They eventually say goodbye when the Avatar goes to the final battle against the Guardian.

Worlds of Ultima companions
Dr. Johann Spector is a friend of the Avatar's from Earth. He becomes corrupted by the power of the Valley of Eodon in Ultima: Savage Empire and declares himself leader of the most powerful tribal village, where he goes by the name Zipactriotl. He plans to unite an army of the insect like creatures, the Myrmidex, to launch an assault on Earth and conquer it. When the Avatar breaks the spell on him, Zipactriotl becomes Dr. Spector again and joins the Avatar's party. He later goes with the Avatar to Mars in Ultima: Martian Dreams. He was based on Warren Spector who for a time worked for Origin.

Arch-enemies

 Yes : The character is in that game.
 No : The character is not in that game.
 M/R : The character is only mentioned or referenced in that game.
 Mnl : The character is only referenced in the game manual.

Mondain
Mondain is a powerful wizard and the villain of Ultima I. He is born as the second son of Wolfgang, the king of the city-state of Akalabeth. Taught by his father, he masters basic magic, learning to control minor creatures, but as he doesn't show compassion, his father bans him from using magic. Mondain quickly retaliates by killing his father and stealing his gem, which he uses to create the "Gem of Immortality." As his power grows, he gains more control over the minions of darkness. He creates many strange, hybrid creatures in his dark laboratories, including minotaurs, lizardmen, orcs, and goblins. Mondain's castle is on an island called Terfin.

After being defeated by Lord British, he summons as many creatures as he can in order to conquer Sosaria. Due to the Gem of Immortality, Mondain cannot be killed in the present time, and he cannot be killed without destroying the gem. The Stranger from Another World uses a time machine to travel back in time 1000 years to when Mondain was first creating the gem. The Stranger manages to destroy Mondain's gem and slay him. Mondain's castle is destroyed in the process.

Shattering the Gem of Immortality forms the basis of two later games, Ultima V: Warriors of Destiny and Ultima Online. Three shards of the gem are found at the location of the sunken remnants of Terfin in Ultima IV: Quest of the Avatar, along with Mondain's skull. The shards later form the Shadowlords in Ultima V and are necessary to defeat them; the skull in Ultima IV kills all creatures within an area, also hurting the Avatar's karma. In Ultima Online, many different shards exist, all of which are parallel universes containing Britannia.

In Ultima Online and Ultima IX: Ascension, Mondain is depicted as bald with a goatee, bearing a resemblance to Ming the Merciless. In Ultima VI, however, he is depicted as having a full head of hair and no facial hair.

Minax
Minax, the beautiful but evil sorceress, is the main enemy of Ultima II: The Revenge of the Enchantress as well as in Ultima Online.

Underestimated because of her youth, Minax was furious at the death of her tutor and revenge set itself within her dark heart. As her talent for magic and capacity of malevolence far exceeded Mondain's, Minax decided to take control of the evils of the world without the gem. Showing huge magical potential in her youth, Minax was recruited as an apprentice by Mondain. The young sorceress later fell in love with the wizard. She survived her paramour's death at the hands of the Stranger (the event of Ultima I) and went into hiding. Ten years later, Minax is now older and very powerful, more than Mondain once was. Minax wants to avenge the death of Mondain; thus, after much research, she learns of the Stranger's homeworld. To destroy her "bane's homeworld", she uses dimensional and time gates to set up the Time of Legends, a place located at the Origin of Times. Thus she will be able to attack everybody living "after" this period in that reality without risking being killed like Mondain, since it is impossible to travel in time to before the Origin of Times. To ensure the Stranger would not interfere with her plans for vengeance, Minax invaded his homeworld of Earth. Once there, she used her dark powers to disturb the fabric of time and destroyed the planet. After the Stranger's death, she would be able to conquer Sosaria easily. Twenty years after the death of Mondain, Minax invaded Sosaria with her legions of Darkness.

In Ultima II, Lord British called for a hero to crush Minax's evil plans. The Stranger, having narrowly escaped the destruction of Earth, answered British's call. Minax's castle, named Shadowguard, could only be reached through timegates (similar to moongates in the later games); even then an enchanted ring was required to pass through the force fields inside. The war against Minax's vile legions was long and hard, but eventually the hero hunted down the sorceress, pursued her as she teleported throughout the castle, and destroyed her with the quicksword Enilno. With the dark energies released with the death of Minax, the lands of Sosaria changed once again, reforming into two continents: Sosaria proper and Ambrosia. But unbeknownst to all, Mondain and Minax had produced a progeny, Exodus - an entity that was neither man nor machine.

Exodus
Exodus is the eponymous villain of Ultima III: Exodus, the creation of both Mondain and Minax. The first sign of the character's appearance is a missing ship, which returns with the crew completely gone and the word "EXODUS" written in blood on the deck of the ship. Exodus then summons creatures to terrorize Sosaria from its castle on the Isle of Fire. Twenty years after Minax's death, the Stranger returns to Sosaria to destroy Exodus.

The passage through the Isle of Fire is blocked by the trapped Great Earth Serpent. The Stranger yells the correct magic word to set the serpent free; the Great Earth Serpent reappears to assist the Avatar in Ultima VII Part Two: Serpent Isle, grateful for being freed. Castle Exodus is protected by various magical barriers, requiring the Stranger's party to obtain marks in order to safely pass through. In addition to various creatures that attack the party, the floor itself comes to life and also attacks.

Exodus is depicted as having a demonic appearance, however the Stranger realizes in the game that Exodus is not a normal living creature. Instead, Exodus is a magical computer that can only be destroyed by inserting the four cards of Love, Sol, Moons, and Death into its four slots. After destroying Exodus, the Isle of Fire sinks into the ocean until Ultima VII: The Black Gate.

In the Forge of Virtue expansion of Ultima VII, the Dark Core of Exodus remains on the island. In order to complete the quests for the add-on, the Avatar must banish the Dark Core into the Ethereal Void.

Lord Blackthorn
Lord Blackthorn becomes regent of Britannia when Lord British disappears while exploring the Underworld in Ultima V. Originally, he is a wise and just ruler, but he is twisted by the Shadowlords and becomes an oppressive tyrant. By the game's conclusion, Lord British is restored to his throne and Blackthorn sent to exile through a red moongate to an unknown world. Ultima VII Part Two: Serpent Isle explains that his destination is the Serpent Isle. While on Serpent Isle, Blackthorn takes refuge among the Xenkan Monks and finds redemption, eventually joining their order. But Ultima IX diverges from this restoration of Lord Blackthorn having him leave the island before the Avatar arrives on the Serpent Island. Blackthorn returns again as a villain in Ultima IX: Ascension, this time as a servant of the Guardian, which again contradicts the restorative end on Ultima VII: Part Two: Serpent Isle. In the end Blackthorn perishes at the hand of Lord British after an extensive magical duel at the center of the Great Stygian Abyss, completely contradicting everything written prior to Ascension and after Ultima VII.

In Ultima Online, the timeline of which diverges from the main series after Ultima I, Blackthorn is the closest friend of Lord British, but at the same time he is also his fiercest enemy. He has been defending the peoples' individuality and freedom of belief by creating his own virtue, chaos. In this case, chaos does not represent the destructive force with which it is usually associated. He eventually forged an alliance with various dark magics and emerged as an evil force. After "surviving" through a few years, he was seemingly killed in an assault on the city of Yew. The evil form was later retconned into being an facsimile, and the original Lord Blackthorn became the king of Britannia. Lord Blackthorn was the virtual persona of Ultima Online project director Starr Long.

The Shadowlords

The Guardian
The Guardian is an alien being of immense power from another dimension. A large red humanoid, he is described as a conqueror of worlds. He first appears in Ultima VII: The Black Gate although for the majority of the game he is only a disembodied voice. Having conquered other worlds, he first attempts to conquer Britannia through his agent Batlin, the founder and leader of the Fellowship. The ultimate plan was to create a black moongate to allow the Guardian to physically enter Britannia and conquer it. The Avatar discovers the Guardian's plan and destroys the black moongate as the Guardian is attempting to enter.

One year later, in Ultima Underworld II: Labyrinth of Worlds, the Guardian attempted to conquer Britannia again by creating a blackrock dome around Castle Britannia and trapping the Avatar and his companions inside. The Guardian planned to send troops through a portal within the castle to conquer Britannia by killing its leaders first. The Avatar defeated the Guardian by destroying the portal and the dome. During the course of the game, the Avatar visited several worlds already conquered or destroyed by the Guardian.

It was revealed in Ultima VII Part Two: Serpent Isle that the Guardian had a backup plan and had sent Batlin to the Serpent Isle to further his plans to conquer Britannia. Batlin attempts to betray the Guardian and is killed for his disloyalty but not before releasing the apocalyptic forces of the Banes of Chaos. The Avatar ends the threat by reuniting the Chaos, Order, and Balance Serpents. At the end of the game, the Avatar is captured by the Guardian.

In Ultima VIII: Pagan, the Guardian trapped the Avatar on Pagan, a world completely under the control of the Guardian. The Avatar eventually masters the different elemental magic of this world and returns to Britannia.

In Ultima IX: Ascension, it is learned that while the Avatar was trapped on Pagan, the Guardian has managed to erect eight huge columns throughout Britannia, in order to pull the two moons out of orbit, crashing into the planet and destroying it. The Avatar destroys the eight columns and defeats the Guardian. In the final battle, the Guardian reveals that he is the Avatar's other half, created from the evil part of the Avatar abandoned at the conclusion of Ultima IV. The Avatar defeats the Guardian by using the Armageddon spell to fuse the two of them into one new being.

Fans and chroniclers of the Ultima series have speculated that the Guardian was a satirical metaphor for Origin's parent company, Electronic Arts, which had been rumored to be stifling Richard Garriott's creative control over the last installments of the series. Supporting this theory is the fact that the three artifacts of the Guardian, first seen in Ultima VII: The Black Gate, are the sphere, the cube, and the tetrahedron, which together are an unmistakable representation of the EA logo during the early 1990s when EA's acquisition of Origin was complete and the games were developed. Furthermore, two members of the Fellowship in The Black Gate, Elizabeth and Abraham (E&A) provide dubious guidance for the Avatar throughout the game and are ultimately unmasked as evildoers. The Guardian is described as the "Destroyer of Worlds", a possible reference to Origin's tagline which read "We create worlds".

Batlin

Other significant or recurring characters

 Yes : The character is in that game.
 No : The character is not in that game.
 AE : An alter-ego of the character is in that game.
 M/R : The character is only mentioned or referenced in that game.
 Mnl : The character is only referenced in the game manual.

Lord British

Lord British is the ruler of Britannia, and an in-game personification of the creator of the series, Richard Garriott. His name comes from a nickname given to him by friends at a computer camp, who felt that his way of saying "hello" was distinctly "British." The "Lord" prefix was added when he played the dungeon master in Dungeons & Dragons games. Garriott released early games, such as Akalabeth, under the name and occasionally appeared in Ultima Online playing as Lord British. He is still known as Lord British even after his departure from Ultima maker Origin Systems: Garriott retained the trademark rights to the name Lord British with its associated symbols, and the character appeared in his latest (and now defunct) online game, Tabula Rasa as General British.

Lord British is a man who comes from Earth to Sosaria through a moongate. He adopts the name Cantabrigian British, taken from his birthplace, Cambridge in the United Kingdom, in favor of his old name. He quickly meets the evil wizard, Mondain, and does battle with him. After defeating him, British becomes known as "Champion of the White Light" and "Lord British, Protector of Akalabeth." Numerous plotlines and side-quests in the Ultima games revolve around one of Lord British's adventures or public works projects. He had a key role in founding the Museum, Conservatory, and innumerable institutions of the Britannian society. He also continuously provides healing, resurrection and other miscellaneous help for the Avatar.

One of the most famous characteristics of Lord British is that he is (supposedly) indestructible. In the past, he has been killed as a result of various glitches and exploits.  This fact has led to the naming of the "Lord British Postulate", a postulate that in any game if a creature is alive, someone somewhere will try to kill it. Most of the games in the series require the use of glitches to kill the character, and Garriott was less than pleased after learning that the character can be lured to be killed by cannon fire in Ultima III: Exodus. During Ultima VII, an easter egg allows British to be killed by a falling gold plaque, which is a reference to an incident at the Origin building; a metal bar, where the magnet on the door attached to it, fell on Garriott's head, warranting a visit to the hospital. One of the characters says, "Yancey-Hausman will pay!" which is a reference to the owner and landlord of the building. During Ultima Onlines beta test, Garriott's character was killed by various bugs and an oversight on Garriott's part. This is considered to be a major event within online gaming, as it gave "players an unprecedented ability to change and influence the game." General British of Tabula Rasa was also killed during beta testing.
In Ultima IX: Ascension, Lord British may be killed by making a poisoned loaf of bread with the rat poison and the bread maker on Earth, and then by replacing his loaf of bread with it.

ChucklesChuckles is Lord British's court jester. He is often found in Castle Britannia. At times, he helps the Avatar, yet he is known to have led the Avatar to a wild goose chase. He is based on Chuck Bueche, one of the founders of Origin Systems.

The Time LordThe Time Lord is a powerful being who ensures the smooth and orderly flow of time through space. In Ultima III, he reveals the correct placement of the Four Cards that would destroy Exodus. In Ultima VII, the Avatar must seek him out to learn more about the Fellowship. He helps the Avatar again in Ultima IX.

The Great Earth SerpentThe Great Earth Serpent is snatched by Exodus and forced to guard the Isle of Fire in Ultima III. The Great Earth Serpent helps the Avatar to restore balance to Serpent Isle in Ultima VII Part II.

The Gypsy
The Avatar visits the Gypsy to determine his or her strength in the virtues before taking on each quest of Ultima IV, V, VI and IX.

Hawkwind
Hawkwind is a renowned cartographer in Ultima III (as mentioned in the game manual). He has become Seer of Souls in Ultima IV and resides in Castle Britannia. He guides the Stranger in the path to Avatarhood. He appears again in Ultima IX, and more to his background is told.

Smith
A talking horse.

Wisps

Nystul

Lord Draxinusom

Arcadion

Other characters in the series

 The King of the White Dragon shares the rulership of the Lands of Danger and Despair (later known as Serpent Isle) with Shamino in Ultima I. By Ultima VII Part Two: Serpent Isle, it is revealed that Shamino was in love with the King of the White Dragon's daughter Beatrix back in Ultima I. When Mondain was defeated, the lands of old Sosaria thundered apart. Shamino at the time was at the Lands of Lord British and could not return to his own land ever since. As a result, Beatrix later died of a broken heart. The King of the White Dragon went mad with grief, and tortured and murdered everyone in his castle's grand banquet for the Solstice Festival amid the goblin invasion. At the end, he flung himself from the tower of his castle. When the Avatar tries to enter his castle in Ultima VII Part Two, his mad ghost appears and tries to kill the hero. His ghost is finally put to rest after a hard battle.
 Sir Simon Lady Tessa Gwenneth is Iolo's apprentice and works in his shop, Iolo's Bows, in Britain. She manages the shop with Gwenno in Ultima V when Iolo has been made an outlaw by Blackthorn. By Ultima VI, she has taken over the shop since Iolo's retirement.
 Dr. Cat Sutek Sin'Vraal Nicodemus Rudyom Penumbra Horance Nell Patterson Nastassia Erstam Beatrix's story is told in Ultima VII Part Two. She was the daughter of the King of the White Dragon and the betrothed of Shamino back in the time of Ultima I. Shamino unfortunately got stranded in the Lands of Lord British due to ancient Sosaria sundering apart from the defeat of Mondain at the hand of the Stranger. Beatrix eventually died of a broken heart in Shamino's castle, which causes her father, the King, to go mad and slay everyone in his castle amid the goblin invasion. Beatrix's spirit remained in Shamino's abandoned castle. In Ultima VII Part Two, Shamino accompanied the Avatar to Serpent Isle. He eventually came upon the ruins of his former castle where Beatrix's ghost, full of rage, confronted him over his seeming betrayal and attacked him.
 Samhayne'

Notes

References

External links
 The Ultima Wiki - containing information of every Ultima character

Ultima series characters